Lee Bit-na (born August 29, 1995) is a South Korean actress.

Early life 
Lee was born on August 29, 1995.

Career 
Lee started her acting career in 2009 and acted in her first television drama 4 years later, in 2013. She is signed under Urbanworks Entertainment.

Filmography

Film

Television

Web series

Music video

Endorsements

References

External links 
 

21st-century South Korean actresses
South Korean film actresses
South Korean television actresses
South Korean child actresses
1995 births
Living people